Jan Willem Aten  (born October 11, 1953) is a Brazilian former Olympic yachtsman in the Star class. He competed in the 1972 Summer Olympics together with Jörg Bruder, where they finished 4th.

References

Olympic sailors of Brazil
Brazilian male sailors (sport)
Star class sailors
Sailors at the 1972 Summer Olympics – Star
1953 births
Living people